Hammerwood is a hamlet in the civil parish of Forest Row in East Sussex, England. The village is situated on the High Weald, on the East Sussex-West Sussex-Kent-Surrey border.

History

Early history
The village's name is derived from connections to the Wealden iron industry, and a reference to the hammer used in the furnace of the iron forge. A Romano-British iron bloomery (now listed as a site of historic interest) was located near the ponds to the south-east of where the modern village – which did not exist at the time – is located, and a blast furnace existed on another site nearby from at least the 1500s. Areas of nearby woodland are similarly named, including Hammer Wood, Cansiron Wood and Cinder Wood. The settlement was, for several centuries, the central part of an estate known as The Bower, and is believed to have comprised part of a medieval deer park.

Development
In 1792, a site to the south-east of the nucleus of the current settlement was selected by architect Benjamin Henry Latrobe and his commissioner, John Sperling, as the location on which they would build Hammerwood Park, a country house which was one of the first examples of Greek Revival architecture in Great Britain (it was Sperling who originally coined the name 'Hammerwood'). Many of the buildings which form part of Hammerwood today were constructed in the 19th century as tied cottages to support the Hammerwood estate, which at that time consisted of  2,500 acres; Oswald Augustus Smith provided in 1864 for a Hammerwood Cricket Club; in 1873 for a village school for 100 children; in 1875 for the Vicarage, and in 1880 for St Stephen's Church, Hammerwood – to the design of E. P. Loftus Brock – at the cost of £7,431 (the first vicar being Rev. Clement Colby Woodland of Corpus Christi College, Cambridge), as well as for a number of other buildings in Holtye and East Grinstead. On 9 July 1880, an ecclesiastical parish of Hammerwood was duly formed from portions of those of East Grinstead and Hartfield. The population of Hammerwood reached a peak of 438 in 1891. St Stephen's Church contains a two manual pipe organ, built by the firm of T. C. Lewis.

20th century

The Hammerwood estate entered a period of decline after the First World War, and much of the village was sold off. In  1930, the owner of Hammerwood Park at that time (a Lt. Col. Pollen) provided for a Hammerwood and Holtye Village Hall, next to the Vicarage. There was also a Hammerwood and Holtye Women's Institute, and a Hammerwood and Holtye Men's Club (both ceased to exist in the 1980s). The Hammerwood County Primary School closed in 1959, and the ecclesiastical parish of Hammerwood was united with that of St Mary Magdalene, Cowden in June 1977.

During the Second World War, on 2 March 1944 a Heinkel He 177 of the Luftwaffe's Kampfgeschwader 100 on a bombing mission to London was shot down over Hammerwood by a Mosquito Mk XIII of No. 151 Squadron RAF at 3:15 am. Six were on board the German aircraft; four survived, and wreckage was scattered widely in nearby woodland. Hammerwood Park was requisitioned for use by the armed forces during that war, becoming home to 200 soldiers (including the cricketer Denis Compton, and a contingent from the Canadian Army). From November 1943, No. 660 Squadron RAF operated from an unpaved airstrip (RAF Hammerwood) to the east of the village, from which the SOE flew Westland Lysanders for a time. Flying ceased by July 1944. 

On 29 August 1944, a V-1 flying bomb which had been shot down by an aircraft came down in the village. After the war, Hammerwood Park was divided into flats and the remnants of the estate were purchased by Led Zeppelin. It subsequently became derelict, before being purchased by the current owner in 1982. A programme of rolling restoration continues.

Hammerwood today
The village now sits in the High Weald AONB, and development is thus strictly limited. The structure of the settlement, set along a lane from the A264, has remained unchanged for more than a century. Now more than 150 years old, Hammerwood Cricket Club continues to play friendly games on Sundays throughout the summer. It won the Hartfield Tournament in 1984. Hammerwood Park has been open to the public since 1983; tours take place at least twice weekly in summer, and musical events are held regularly. 

There is a Scout campsite at Hammerwood owned and operated by the Lewisham North District Scouts. St Stephen's Church held its last service on 20 March 2016 (Palm Sunday), and the parish (which encompassed the villages of Hammerwood and Holtye) was dissolved later that year. That part of the former parish in Hammerwood were transferred to the parish of Forest Row and Ashurst Wood, whilst parts of the parish in Holtye were transferred to the parish of Hartfield. 

In November 2016, the Secretary of State for Culture, Media and Sport decided to upgrade the Listing for St Stephen's Church to grade II* due to its architectural merit, preservation and connection to the historic estate. Additionally, the 1879 decorated gothic lych gate and church walls were newly listed at grade II. For a settlement of its size, Hammerwood thus has an unusual number of buildings of historic and architectural interest. The Bower House, a 15th-century timber-framed farmhouse, is listed at grade II*, its cottages at grade II, the Old School House, Brooklands, and Great Cansiron Farm at grade II, and Hammerwood Park at grade I.

Geography

Transport
Much of the settlement is set along a lane running south from the A264, which links the hamlet to East Grinstead, Tunbridge Wells and beyond. Hammerwood Park has a registered unlicensed helicopter landing site for visiting pilots. The nearest railway stations are:

  Cowden, with up to two trains per hour to London Bridge (from 45 minutes) via Oxted, and up to two trains per hour to Uckfield

  Dormans, with two trains per hour to London Victoria (from 52 minutes) via Oxted, two trains per hour to East Grinstead, and peak hour Thameslink services to various London termini, and Bedford.

There is no bus service. Metrobus's 291 service stops hourly adjacent to the War Memorial in Ashurst Wood (approximately 45 minutes' walk south from Hammerwood) with services to Crawley, East Grinstead, Tunbridge Wells and surrounding villages. Go Coach operates a thrice-daily 234 service from opposite the White Horse Inn in Holtye (approximately 45 minutes' walk east from Hammerwood) to Cowden, Edenbridge, Tunbridge Wells and surrounding villages as well as a daily 238 service to Cowden, Edenbridge, Chartwell and Sevenoaks.

References

Hamlets in East Sussex
Forest Row